Nuttallia  may refer to:
 Nuttallia, a genus of saltwater clams in the family Psammobiidae
 Nuttallia, a synonym of the plant genus Callirhoe in the family Malvaceae